Thomas Edmund Gilbey (20 January 1898 – 1962) was an English footballer who played professionally for Gillingham. Although he only made 11 Football League appearances for the Kent-based club, he was notable for scoring the Gills' first ever league goal, against Southampton in August 1920.

References

1898 births
1962 deaths
Sportspeople from Bishop Auckland
Footballers from County Durham
Gillingham F.C. players
Darlington F.C. players
English footballers
Association football forwards